Thomas Boone may refer to:
Thomas Boone (governor) (1730–1812), colonial governor of South Carolina and New Jersey
Thomas Boone (JAG), a recurring character on the American television series JAG

See also
Thomas Boone Pickens (1928–2019), American financier